Bob Kennett is a New Zealand racecar driver who raced strictly in the United States. He is the father of New Zealand race car driver Brady Kennett.

In 1969 he raced in the US Trans-Am Series in a Porsche 911. He finished 14th at the Kent 300 in Seattle (third in class) and 9th in the ARRC Daytona. In 1970 he again raced in the Trans-Am Series, but this time in a Ford Mustang. He had a DNF in Round 1 at Laguna Seca Raceway and was 16th in Round 10 at the Kent 200 in Seattle. He did, however, have some wins in the US West Coast National Championship.

External links
 Laguna Seca 19 April 1970
 1969 ARRC (Daytona)
 Trans-Am Racing 1970
 Bob's 1967 Notchback Mustang

Living people
New Zealand racing drivers
Place of birth missing (living people)
Year of birth missing (living people)